Gréta Arn was the defending champion, but lost to Julia Görges in the first round.

Unseeded Zheng Jie won the tournament, after her opponent Flavia Pennetta retired in the final.

Seeds

Draw

Finals

Top half

Bottom half

Qualifying

Seeds

Qualifiers

Qualifying draw

First qualifier

Second qualifier

Third qualifier

Fourth qualifier

References
 Main Draw
 Qualifying Draw

ASB Classic - Singles
2012 Singles